Hacıturalı is a village and municipality in the Agdam District of Azerbaijan. It has a total population of 1,857.

References 

Populated places in Aghdam District